The women's super-G of the 2006 Winter Olympics was held at San Sicario, Italy, on Monday, 20 February; it was delayed a day due to poor weather conditions.

Defending Olympic champion Daniela Ceccarelli was 37th in the current season's World Cup downhill standings, headed by Michaela Dorfmeister from Austria, followed by teammate Alexandra Meissnitzer.  Anja Pärson of Sweden was defending world champion and was fourth in the current season's super-G standings.

Dorfmeister won the gold medal, Janica Kostelić of Croatia took the silver, and Meissnitzer was the bronze medalist; Pärson was twelfth and Ceccarelli was 31st. Dorfmeister had also won the downhill gold medal five days earlier, and Kostelic's medal was her sixth at the Olympics.

Results 
Monday, 20 February 2006

The race was started at 14:45 local time, (UTC +1).

References

External links 
 Official Olympic Report
 Results
 FIS results

Super-G